There are at least nine members of the St. Johnswort and Waterwort order: Theales found in Montana.  Some of these species are exotics (not native to Montana).

St. John's wort
Family: Clusiaceae
Hypericum anagalloides, tinker's-penny
Hypericum majus, larger Canadian St. John's-wort
Hypericum perforatum, common St. John's-wort
Hypericum scouleri, western St. John's-wort
Hypericum scouleri subsp. nortoniae, western St. John's-wort
Hypericum scouleri subsp. scouleri, Scouler's St. Johns-wort

Waterwort
Family: Elatinaceae
Elatine brachysperma, short-seeded water-wort
Elatine californica, California water-wort
Elatine triandra, longstem water-wort

Further reading

See also
 List of dicotyledons of Montana

Notes

Montana